Grêmio Foot-Ball Santanense, commonly known as Grêmio Santanense, is a Brazilian football club based in Santana do Livramento, Rio Grande do Sul and part of the state league competition in the state of Rio Grande do Sul. They won the Campeonato Gaúcho in 1937.

History
The club was founded on June 11, 1913, adopting Grêmio's name and Internacional's colors. They won the Campeonato Gaúcho in 1937, and the Série A3 in 1967. Grêmio Santanense also won the Campeonato do Interior Gaúcho in 1937 and in 1948.

Achievements
 Campeonato Gaúcho:
 Winners (1): 1937
 Série A3:
 Winners (1): 1967
 Campeonato do Interior Gaúcho:
 Winners (2): 1937, 1948

Stadium
Grêmio Foot-Ball Santanense play their home games at Estádio Honório Nunes. The stadium has a maximum capacity of 8,000 people.

References

Association football clubs established in 1913
Football clubs in Rio Grande do Sul
1913 establishments in Brazil
Santana do Livramento